Cynthia J. Ball is an American politician and member of the North Carolina House of Representatives. A Democrat, she was first elected in 2016 and then re-elected in 2018 and 2020 to represent the 49th district, representing Wake County.

Life and career 
Ball was born in Franklin County, North Carolina. She earned a BA in psychology from the University of North Carolina at Greensboro and an MBA at Virginia Commonwealth University. She works as a professional mediator. She lives in Raleigh, North Carolina, and is married to David Aspnes, a physics professor at North Carolina State University.

Committee assignments

2021-2022 session
Appropriations 
Appropriations - Education
Education - K-12 
Election Law and Campaign Finance Reform
Health
Local Government - Land Use, Planning and Development

2019-2020 session
Appropriations 
Appropriations - Education
Education - K-12 
Election Law and Campaign Finance Reform
Health 
Commerce

2017-2018 session
Appropriations
Appropriations - Education
Health
Insurance
State and Local Government II
State Personnel

Electoral history

2020

2018

2016

References

External links

Living people
Year of birth missing (living people)
People from Franklin County, North Carolina
People from Raleigh, North Carolina
University of North Carolina at Greensboro alumni
Virginia Commonwealth University alumni
Politicians from Raleigh, North Carolina
Democratic Party members of the North Carolina House of Representatives
Women state legislators in North Carolina
21st-century American politicians
21st-century American women politicians